Schiefner is a surname. Notable people with the surname include:

 Franz Anton Schiefner (1817–1879), Baltic German linguist and tibetologist
 Udo Schiefner (born 1959), German politician

See also
 Schiffner